Richard J. Donovan Correctional Facility (RJDCF or RJD) is a California state prison located in unincorporated southern San Diego County, California, near San Diego. It is a part of the California Department of Corrections and Rehabilitation. It is a  facility. It is the only state prison in San Diego County.

The Otay Mesa site is shared with six other properties related to law enforcement:

 the federal San Diego Correctional Facility privately operated by the Corrections Corporation of America
 the George Bailey Detention Facility (San Diego County)
 the East Mesa Reentry Facility (San Diego County)
 the Facility 8 Detention Facility (San Diego County)
 the East Mesa Juvenile Detention Facility (San Diego County)
 and a multi-jurisdictional law enforcement firearms training complex used by the FBI, the Customs Service, and local police forces

Facility
The prison cells were designed to house one person each, however, due to overcrowding, many house two prisoners each. For example, in March 2012, the facility's total population was more than 166.6% of its design capacity.

As of July 31, 2022, RJDCF was incarcerating people at 102.7% of its design capacity, with 3,074 occupants.

In 1989, RJDCF opened a reception center which accepted newly sentenced inmates from across Southern California. However, in 2012, the institution changed from its previous reception center mission, and completed the conversion of three of its five facilities to sensitive needs yards. Other missions have included housing and providing treatment to inmates with severe mental illnesses, and inmates who have been identified as having medium to high risk medical concerns.

Donovan has five interfaith chapels. Each religion represented at Donovan gets a series of lockers to store materials.

The prison includes a bakery that serves the facility and five other CDCR facilities. Each day, it produces about 9,760 loaves. About 85 prisoners work in the bakery, as of 2010. During that year, the monthly salary of a prisoner working in the bakery was between $90 ($ when adjusted for inflation) and $100 ($ when adjusted for inflation). KPBS said that bakery jobs were "desirable" compared to clerk and custodial jobs, which pay a monthly salary between $24 and $48.

The prison also includes a shoe factory; it manufactures shoes used by prisoners throughout CDCR. It makes both high-top and low-top versions. About 1,000  shoes are produced every day. In 2010, the monthly salary for an employee was between $90 and $100, so the shoe factory positions are prized in Donovan.

The prison formerly housed an eyeglass factory. It built glasses for Medi-Cal patients. About 115 prisoners worked in the factory. It closed in 2009. As of 2010, there are discussions about a possible reopening.

On November 22, 2013, Sirhan Sirhan was transferred to Donovan. Sirhan was convicted of assassinating Robert F. Kennedy. The transfer to Donovan occurred, coincidentally, on the 50th anniversary of the assassination of Robert Kennedy's brother, John F. Kennedy.

Operations
Each week, "Level 4" (maximum security) prisoners may have 15 hours of yard time.

Demographics
In 2010, Donovan Correctional Facility had about 4,800 prisoners. Between 150 and 200 of the prisoners were Native Americans.

During that year prisoners belonged to 15 religious faiths.

Notable prisoners

Current
 Jesse James Hollywood – Convicted of kidnapping and ordering the murder of Nicholas Markowitz
 Anand Jon – Former fashion designer convicted of rape and other sexual offenses
 Kenneth Kimes Jr. – Son and accomplice of Sante Kimes
 Suge Knight – Former CEO and co-founder of Death Row Records, convicted of voluntary manslaughter
 Daniel William Marsh – Convicted of the murders of Claudia Maupin and Oliver Northup
 The Menendez Brothers – Convicted of murdering their parents
 James Mitchell – Heir to the San Francisco-based Mitchell Brothers adult film business, one of the porn industry's pioneer dynasties during the 1960s and 1970s. Mitchell is the son of Jim Mitchell, who started the famous adult entertainment empire with his brother, Artie. He is a convicted murderer who was sentenced to 35 years to life in 2011 for killing the mother of his daughter with a softball bat in a Novato backyard and kidnapping their young daughter in 2009.
 Mark Rogowski – Former professional skateboarder convicted of murdering Jessica Bergsten
 Billie Dureyea Shell – New York Times Best Selling Author and Son of Former NFL Hall Of Famer Art L. Shell Convicted of second-degree murder.
 Sirhan Sirhan – Assassin of Robert F. Kennedy
 Tex Watson – Convicted killer and member of the Manson Family

Former
 Anerae Brown – Rapper and Crips gang member known as "X-Raided" convicted of gang-related homicide; released on parole in 2018
 John Getreu – Convicted serial killer
 Roy Norris – One of the two "Tool Box Killers"; was later moved to the California Medical Facility, where he died of natural causes a week later on February 24, 2020, at 72 years old.
 John Robert Schrieffer – Physicist and Nobel Prize winner convicted of and sentenced to two years for vehicular manslaughter. At 88 years old, died in a Florida nursing home in July 2019.
 Antron Singleton – Rapper known as "Big Lurch" convicted of killing and cannibalizing his roommate.

References

External links

 Richard J. Donovan Correctional Facility Official webpage
 California Department of Corrections and Rehabilitation Official website

1987 establishments in California
Prisons in California
Buildings and structures in San Diego County, California